The Hacker Wars is a 2014 documentary film about hacktivism in the United States, directed by Vivien Lesnik Weisman. It was released on October 17, 2014 in the US.

Barrett Brown, who appeared in the documentary, was examined as a spokesperson for Anonymous, a label he disputes.

The Hacker Wars tells the story of three young information activists, or hacktivists, and their battles with the US Government. These hacktivists are either terrorists or freedom fighters depending on one's perspective on who should control information.

It is about: “Weev,” infamous hacker and troll; Barrett Brown, journalist and propagandist for the hacktivist collective, Anonymous; and Jeremy Hammond, aka Anarchaos, who before his arrest was number one on the FBI's cyber-criminal list. The fourth character is Sabu, the hacker turned FBI informant who ran the FBI's cyber unit for 9 months and is responsible for their arrests. He is the shadowy protagonist in a high-stakes game of espionage and betrayal in the age of the Internet.

In the film Barrett Brown, American journalist, is facing 105 years in prison for publicizing information revealed through Jeremy Hammond's epic hacks. Hammond himself had just begun a 10-year prison term.

Andrew Aurenheimer, known by his hacker handle “weev” embarrasses large corporations. He was sentenced to 41 months for hacking AT&T, but his conviction was overturned. He vows to continue doing what landed him in prison in the first place.

The film is structured like Nashville on Meth. The viewer is shuttled between story lines at lightning speed mirroring the disjointed lives of the protagonists and life on the Internet.

Glenn Greenwald (Snowden Leaks), Pulitzer Prize-winning journalist; Thomas Drake, former Senior Executive of the NSA; “the original Edward Snowden”; and others explain why these anti-heroes exposing the security surveillance state through hacking should be supported rather than jailed. They are not merely unveiling surveillance programs and the deep-state intelligence; they are exposing how power works. According to Glenn Greenwald, “What the Anonymous collective and Hammond’s hacks revealed and Barrett Brown publicized is so criminal that it must be exposed no matter what the means. The US Government will go to any lengths, including the suspension of the rule of law, to stop them.”

Barrett Brown, weev, and Jeremy Hammond have been covered in Rollingstone, Vice, The Wall Street Journal, The New York Times, The Washington Post, Wired, Gawker, BuzzFeed, and The Nation, and are well known in France and the UK.

The Hacker Wars is the second feature documentary by Vivien Lesnik Weisman. She studied Political Science at Barnard College. She attended NY Law School and was received in both the NY and Washington DC Bar Association. She went on to receive a Master of Fine Arts in Directing from the UCLA School of Theatre, Film and Television. Her last film, Man of Two Havanas, opened at Tribeca Film Festival, was met with critical acclaim, and has gone on to win the most prestigious awards throughout the world.

She has appeared on numerous television and radio news programs throughout the country and abroad, including WNBC, WCBS,  Democracy Now, Telemundo, Univision, and MegaTV, to name a few. She was a regular contributor to The Huffington Post.

Her films have been the recipients of Grand Prix Documentary at the Festival Internacional du Cinema Latin de Paris, the IFP Fledgling Fund Award for Best WIP, IFP Best Emerging Latino Filmmaker, Audience Award at The Vancouver International Latino Film Festival, First Coral Award at the Festival de Nuevo Cine Latino Americano (Havana International Film Festival), the Grand Prix Signis at the Festival Internacional du Cinema Latin de Paris, Golden Eagle, UCLA Spot Light Award, as well as the Social Justice Award Finalist at The Santa Barbara Film Festival.

References

External links

SXSW, The Hacker Wars documentary was the subject of a panel discussion at SXSW Interactive, March 2014  
Vice MotherBoard, “South By Southwest Is Ready for War,” March 8, 2014  
Huffington Post, “Weev Wins Battle in The Hacker Wars,” April 21, 2014  
YourAnonNews, The Hacker Wars at SXSW  Anonymous Radio Lorax Live, Interview with Vivien Lesnik Weisman on her upcoming film The Hacker Wars, May 20, 2014  
RadioAnonOps, Interview with the director of The Hacker Wars (video), May 19, 2014 
De -Manufacturing Consent,  Radio Show, Interview with Vivien Lesnik Weisman, director of The Hacker Wars, December 21, 2013  
Huffington Post, “A Conversation with Jeremy Hammond, American Political Prisoner Sentenced to 10 Years,” November 19, 2013   
Huffington Post, “The Strange Case of Barrett Brown Just Got Stranger,” August 11, 2013 
Huffington Post, “Jeremy Hammond, American Political Prisoner,” May 29, 2013    
Huffington Post, “Weev, the Hacker Who Didn’t Hack AT&T,” March 25, 2013

Documentary films about the Internet
2014 documentary films
Hacking (computer security)
American documentary films
Internet-based activism
Anonymous (hacker group)
Works about computer hacking
2010s English-language films
2010s American films